Resident Evil 2002 may refer to:

Resident Evil (2002 video game), GameCube game
Resident Evil (film), released in 2002